The 1977–78 Bulgarian Cup was the 38th season of the Bulgarian Cup (in this period the tournament was named Cup of the Soviet Army). Marek Dupnitsa won the competition, beating CSKA Sofia 1–0 in the final at the Vasil Levski National Stadium.

First round

|-
!colspan=3 style="background-color:#D0F0C0;" |10 December 1977

|}

Second round

|-
!colspan=3 style="background-color:#D0F0C0;" |17 December 1977

|}

Third round

Quarter-finals

Semi-finals

Final

Details

References

1977-78
1977–78 domestic association football cups
Cup